The Brussels massacre was an anti-Semitic episode in Brussels (then within the Duchy of Brabant) in 1370 in connection with an alleged host desecration at the Brussels synagogue. A number of Jews, variously given as six or about twenty,  were executed or otherwise killed, while the rest of the small community was banished. The event occurred on May 22.

The supposedly recovered hosts became objects of veneration for local Christians as the Sacrament of Miracle. The cult survived until after the Second World War and the Holocaust, after which its antisemitic elements pushed the local church to derecognise it. It was claimed that the hosts had been stabbed by Jews and had miraculously shed blood, but been otherwise unharmed. The reliquary (without the hosts) is currently preserved in the cathedral's treasury (the hosts may have been present inside it as late as the year 2000).

Background
Black Death Jewish persecutions had previously destroyed Brussels' Jewish community in 1350. According to Premonstratensian historian Placide Lefèvre, contemporary treasury records indicate that by 1370 there were eight Jewish households in Brussels and two in Leuven.

In 1369, two priests in Brussels were arrested for usury and turned over to the ecclesiastical tribunal of the Church of St. Michael and St. Gudula (now the cathedral) for investigation: it transpired that they had attempted to circumvent usury prohibitions by lending money to a Jew named Mesterman who in turn lent it out at interest. The clerical usury scandal in Brussels was the immediate context of the accusations of host desecration, a common anti-Semitic canard in medieval Europe, with wafers that Jews had supposedly tried to profane often said to have been miraculously spared from harm.

Allegations

The version of the allegations attested from 1403 was that a rich Jew from Enghien wanted to obtain some consecrated hosts to profane, and bribed a male Jewish convert to Christianity from Leuven to steal some. Shortly thereafter, the Enghien merchant was murdered. His widow passed the stolen hosts to the Jews of Brussels, where in the synagogue on Good Friday 1370 some tried to stab the wafers with their daggers, causing blood to pour forth. A female Jewish convert to Christianity was paid to take the hosts to Cologne's Jews, but remorsefully told the story to the parson of Notre-Dame de la Chapelle in Brussels, who took possession of the hosts.  The Duke of Brabant, on the woman's testimony, ordered the stabbers burnt at the stake and the remaining Jews banished, with their property confiscated.

Cult of the Miracle

The hosts were placed in reliquaries and preserved in the then collegiate church of Saint Gudula, the patron saint of Brussels, an important symbol of the area's Catholic identity. They became a feature of the annual procession on her feast day.

Emperor Charles V and the Habsburgs, as well as their relatives, donated seven stained glass windows on which the miracle is depicted. These were executed by Antwerp glass-maker Jan Hack after creations by Bernard van Orley and Michiel Coxcie. Four of them are still in place today. This compared perceived Jewish anti-Catholicism to the nascent Protestant Reformation, with the miraculous bleeding countering Protestant denials of transubstantiation.

In the early 1580s, during a period of Calvinist rule in Brussels, all Catholic ceremonies were suppressed. From 1579 to 1585 the relics had been hidden in a house in the Korte Ridderstraat. After the end of Calvinist rule in 1585, a procession of citizens and officeholders had retrieved the hosts and carried them back to the church. The re-emergence of the cult in 1585 was primarily as a celebration of the end of Calvinist rule. The Archdukes Albert and Isabella, who ruled in Brussels 1598–1621, made the annual procession a state occasion:
The Blessed Sacrament of Miracles ... had emerged as doubly miraculous after the end of Calvinist rule in Brussels in 1585 when it became clear that the sacred hosts had survived intact. The annual procession in honour of the Sacrament now became as much a commemoration of the second anti-Calvinist miracle as of the first anti-Semitic one and, after their accession, the Archdukes conscientiously attended the procession every year while also turning it into a veritable state event.

Five windows added in the nineteenth century depict the development of the cult of the Miracle; these were donated by Belgian kings Leopold I and Leopold II and other nobles, this time linking the Miracle to the contemporary Catholic opposition to secularism.

The 1870 quincentenary jubilee of the Miracle would have been marked with extraordinary celebrations, but tension between catholic and liberal circles was increasingly rising. Liberals, including the anti-Semite Edmond Picard, had called for a boycott of the festivities. A pamphlet by Charles Potvin (under the pseudonym Dom Liber) gave rise to a violent controversy with the young priest Hyacinthe De Bruyn, which was also fueled by imminent elections. As a consequence, church authorities decided to cancel these celebrations.

Retraction
After the Second World War, in light of the mass murder of Belgian Jews during The Holocaust, the anti-semitic elements of the cult were de-emphasised. In 1968, in the wake of Nostra aetate issued by the Second Vatican Council, the Archdiocese of Mechelen-Brussels officially derecognised the cult. In 1977 Cardinal Leo Joseph Suenens installed a plaque in the cathedral to highlight this. On November 16, 2006 at the inauguration of the exhibit Menorah in the Cathedral by Jean Paul Leon presented by the Jewish Museum of Belgium, Monsignor Jozef De Kesel addressed the attendees and Albert Guigui as Chief Rabbi of the Great Synagogue of Europe and apologised for the commemoration of the Brussels massacre on the windows of the Cathedral. The former chapel of Saint Gudula is now the cathedral museum, displaying its treasures, including the former reliquaries, with contextual information.

See also
 History of the Jews in Belgium
 List of massacres in Belgium
 Martyrdom in Judaism

Footnotes

References

14th-century massacres
Medieval anti-Jewish pogroms
History of Brussels
Jewish Belgian history
Jews and Judaism in Brussels
14th century in the duchy of Brabant
1370s in the Holy Roman Empire
1370 in Europe